The Men's 400 metre freestyle competition of the 2014 FINA World Swimming Championships (25 m) was held on 5 December with the heats and the semifinals and 6 December with the final.

Records
Prior to the competition, the existing world and championship records were as follows.

The following records were established during the competition:

Results

Heats
The Heats were held at 11:13.

Final
The final was held at 18:55.

References

Men's 400 metre freestyle